Code page 777 (also known as CP 777) is a code page used under DOS to write the Lithuanian language. It is a modification of Code page 773 to support the accented Lithuanian letters and phonetic symbols for Lithuanian.

Character set
The following table shows code page 777. Each character is shown with its equivalent Unicode code point. Only the second half of the table (code points 128–255) is shown, the first half (code points 0–127) being the same as code page 437.

References

777